Podu Iloaiei is a town in Iași County, Western Moldavia, Romania. It has 9,573 inhabitants as of 2011, and was declared a town in 2005. Four villages are administered by the town: Budăi, Cosițeni, Holm and Scobâlțeni.

Population

Natives
 Sabetai Unguru

See also
 Battle of Podu Iloaiei

References

External links

Towns in Romania
Populated places in Iași County
Localities in Western Moldavia